Sarmientichnus is an ichnogenus of dinosaur footprint.

Fossil record
These footprints have been found in Callovian/Oxfordian eolian sandstones of Argentina (age range: from 164.7 to 155.7 million years ago). They have been identified as belonging to small ground dwelling carnivore dinosaurs, probably Coelurosaurs. The size of the largest footprint was 4.4 cm (0.14 ft) and was made by an individual that was 65 cm (2.1 ft) in length and 495 grams (1.1 lbs) in weight.

See also

 List of dinosaur ichnogenera

References

 

Dinosaur trace fossils
Theropods